This is a list of Dutch television related events from 2016.

Events
29 January - Maan de Steenwinkel wins the sixth series of The Voice of Holland.
1 April - 13-year-old Esmée Schreurs wins the fifth series of The Voice Kids.
3 June - 18-year-old singer Nick Nicolai wins the 8th series of Holland's Got Talent.
8 June - Nina den Hartog wins the fifth series of Idols.

Debuts
23 March - Idols (2002-2008, 2016–present)

Television shows

1950s
NOS Journaal (1956–present)

1970s
Sesamstraat (1976–present)

1980s
Jeugdjournaal (1981–present)
Het Klokhuis (1988–present)

1990s
Goede tijden, slechte tijden (1990–present)

2000s
X Factor (2006–present)
Holland's Got Talent (2008–present)

2010s
The Voice of Holland (2010–present)

Ending this year

Births

Deaths

See also
2016 in the Netherlands